Claude Bérit-Débat (born 19 February 1946 in Mirepeix, Pyrénées-Atlantiques) is a member of the Senate of France, representing the Dordogne department.  He is a member of the Socialist Party.

References
Page on the Senate website

1946 births
Living people
People from Béarn
Socialist Party (France) politicians
French Senators of the Fifth Republic
Senators of Dordogne